Raoul of Saint Omer, Raoul of Tiberias or Ralph of Tiberias (died 1220) was briefly Prince of Galilee and twice Seneschal of Jerusalem of the Kingdom of Jerusalem. His father was Walter of Saint Omer, his mother Eschiva of Bures. She remarried Raymond III of Tripoli in 1174. (Some accounts note Eschiva or Eshive as Elinard's sister).

His elder brother Hugh tried arrange a marriage between Ralph and Queen Isabella I and thereby raise him to the throne, after her husband Henry II of Champagne died. This was rejected by the High Court because of his lack of wealth and instead King Aimery married her. Ralph was exiled after an assassination attempt on Aimery in 1198. At his trial Ralph devised a defence from an interpretation of the  based on the requirement of a judgment in court for cases concerning lords and their vassals. The innovation was applying the Assise to the king himself. Aimery refused and his vassals withdrew service from him following great words and Ralph went into banishment. In later accounts Ralph was credited with a great achievement. He set a precedent applying the assise to the actions of the crown providing himself and his peers with justification, a method of resistance and sanctions that could be legally applied. Equally it is clear that the use the  had been ineffective. Aimery had refused and Ralph had found it necessary to leave the country.

He went to Tripoli in 1198, Constantinople in 1204.

Family
He married Agnes de Grenier, daughter of Renaud, Lord of Sidon. They had:
Eschive of Tiberias, married Odo of Montbeliard

References

Bibliography

 

1220 deaths
Christians of the Fifth Crusade
12th-century jurists
Year of birth unknown
Saint-Omer family
13th-century jurists
Princes of Galilee